Vinod Mehta (31 May 1942 – 8 March 2015) was an Indian journalist, editor and political commentator. He was also the founder editor-in-chief of Outlook from 1995 to 2012 and had been editor of publications such as The Pioneer, The Sunday Observer, The Independent and The Indian Post. He was also the author of several books.

Life 
On 31 May 1942, Mehta was born in Rawalpindi, in Punjab, British India. His family became refugees in 1945. He grew up as an army boy in Lucknow, an experience that turned him into a determined secularist. He attended La Martinere school and the university there.

Mehta lived in New Delhi. He was married to Sumita Paul, a journalist who has worked for The Pioneer and the Sunday edition of  The Times of India. He had a daughter from a prior relationship, the existence of whom he revealed in a memoir after encouragement from his wife.

Mehta died of multi-organ failure in New Delhi on 8 March 2015, after a prolonged illness.

Career 
Leaving home with a third-class BA degree, Mehta experimented with a string of jobs, including that of a factory-hand in suburban Britain, before accepting an offer to edit Debonair in 1974, a men's magazine.

Mehta became one of India's most influential editors by launching a number of successful publications such as the Sunday Observer in 1981, The Indian Post in 1987, The Independent in 1989, The Pioneer (Delhi edition) in 1990 and, finally, Outlook in 1995. He was editorial chairman of the Outlook Group.

Mehta was forced to resign from the editorship of The Independent newspaper in 1989, 29 days after launching it, because of a story based on a dubious RAW report, calling the Maharashtrian politician Y. B. Chavan a spy, which Mehta ran with an eight-column banner headline.

Vinod Mehta has authored a biography of Meena Kumari and Sanjay Gandhi, and published (in 2001) a collection of his articles under the title Mr Editor, How Close Are You to the PM? His memoir, Lucknow Boy, was published in 2011. Mehta is infamous for his comment praising Pakistan's military dictator Pervez Musharraf at Agra Summit held in 2001 where he said to Musharraf that "I support you so much that in India, they call me your man."

Mehta was a TV panellist and frequently appeared on TV shows like Newshour on Times Now and India at 9 at CNN-IBN. He was called upon by news anchors as a senior journalist and was sought after for his analysis of major issues and scenarios. He remained editor-in-chief of Outlook till February 2012.

He was president of the Editors Guild of India and was, briefly, the writer and presenter of "Letter from India" on the BBC World Service and BBC Radio 4.

On 9 February 2015 he was awarded the Yash Bharti Award by the Government of Uttar Pradesh for his work in the field of journalism.

Lawsuit
In 2012 the Indian Express attempted to sue Mehta for defamation after he had hinted that a story it had run was planted.

Praise 
In her column in The Indian Express, Coomi Kapoor, who worked under Mehta for many years, said

Major works 

 Bombay: A Private View (1971)
 Meena Kumari (1972) [Re-launched in May 2013], 
 Mr Editor, how close are you to the PM? (1999), 
 Lucknow Boy: A Memoir (2010), 
 The Sanjay Story (2012), 
 Editor Unplugged (2014)

References

External links 
A review of Lucknow Boy 
A review of Editor Unplugged
Transcripts : The Radia Tapes contains all the leaked audio transcripts between Nira Radia and other high-profile people
Arnab Goswami's Tribute to Mr Mehta -  The Editor I never had

1942 births
2015 deaths
20th-century Indian journalists
Indian newspaper editors
Indian magazine editors
Writers from Lucknow
Indian male journalists
La Martinière College, Lucknow alumni
University of Lucknow alumni
20th-century Indian biographers
Deaths from multiple organ failure
Journalists from Uttar Pradesh
20th-century Indian male writers
Punjabi people
Male biographers